U.S. Route 371 is a north–south United States highway in the U.S. states of Arkansas and Louisiana. The highway's northern terminus is in De Queen, Arkansas at an intersection with U.S. Highway 70. It is co-signed for its last  between Lockesburg, Arkansas and DeQueen with U.S. Highway 59 and U.S. Highway 71.

Route description

Louisiana

U.S. 371 is an afterthought in the federal highway system. Within Louisiana it was merely the 1990s renumbering and re-signing of the post-1955 Louisiana Highway 7 north of US 71, which after the 1990s change ceased to exist as a number for a state highway in Louisiana. The section south of US 71 was the post-1955 Louisiana Highway 179, which after the 1990s change ceased to exist as a number for a state highway in Louisiana. It also replaced a section of Louisiana Highway 177. Although signage is on I-49, US 371 begins just north of Coushatta, Louisiana at an intersection with US 71.  Intersecting I-20 and US 80 at Minden, it then crosses the Arkansas Line at Springhill, Louisiana. Louisiana Highway 371, on the other hand, was renumbered to Louisiana Highway 3277 because of the creation of US 371.

Arkansas

US 371 enters Arkansas in Columbia County. The route runs north to intersect AR 160 in Taylor and winds east to Magnolia. A concurrency with US 82 begins in Magnolia, and continues north to the city limits. US 371 continues west to meet AR 98 in Waldo, before heading north to enter Nevada County. The route next meets AR 32 and AR 76 before entering Rosston, where a short concurrency with US 278 forms. US 371 meets AR 372 before entering Prescott, where the route runs with AR 24 and is intersected by Interstate 30 before entering Hempstead County.

US 371 winds through Hempstead County west and north, concurring briefly with AR 195 and eventually entering Howard County. The route passes through Nashville, again meeting US 278, and runs west through rural land and into Sevier County. In Sevier County, US 371 meets US 59/US 71, which form a northern concurrency, eventually adding US 70 as well. These four routes run together west to De Queen, at which US 371 terminates.

History

Initially referenced as the Bi-State Corridor, the Arkansas State Highway Commission designated several state highways as a proposed corridor to seek AASHTO approval as a US highway in January 1994. Upon receiving approval, the route was officially commissioned in Arkansas as Highway 371 on August 24, 1994.

Minnesota

A prior, unrelated US 371 was decommissioned in Minnesota in 1971.  The route still bears the designation of MN 371.

Major intersections

See also

Related routes:
U.S. Route 71
U.S. Route 171
U.S. Route 271
LA 7 in the pre-1955 Louisiana Highway numbering

References

External links

Endpoints of US highway 371

71-3
71-3
71-3
3
Transportation in DeSoto Parish, Louisiana
Transportation in Red River Parish, Louisiana
Transportation in Bienville Parish, Louisiana
Transportation in Webster Parish, Louisiana
Transportation in Columbia County, Arkansas
Transportation in Nevada County, Arkansas
Transportation in Hempstead County, Arkansas
Transportation in Howard County, Arkansas
Transportation in Sevier County, Arkansas